Felix Schoft (born 6 July 1990) is a German ski jumper.

In the World Cup he finished once among the top 20, with a seventeenth place from Pragelato in December 2008.

References

1990 births
Living people
German male ski jumpers